Usher 1C is a human gene. Recessive alleles of this gene are responsible for type 1C Usher syndrome and nonsyndromic deafness.

The official name of the gene Usher 1C is “Usher syndrome 1C (autosomal recessive, severe).”

USH1C is the gene's official symbol. The USH1C gene is also known by other names, listed in the Other Names section, below.

Function 
The USH1C gene carries the instructions for the production of a protein called harmonin. Harmonin has the ability to bind to many other proteins in cell membranes and coordinates their activities. Harmonin sometimes acts as a bridge linking proteins in the cell membrane to those in the cytoskeleton, the internal framework that supports the cell.

Research suggests that harmonin plays a role in the development and maintenance of hairlike projections called stereocilia. Stereocilia line the inner ear and bend in response to sound waves. This bending motion is critical for converting sound waves to nerve impulses, an essential process for normal hearing. In the inner ear, protein complexes organized by harmonin probably act as connectors that link stereocilia into a bundle. This protein complex likely helps regulate the transmission of sound waves.

Harmonin is also made in specialized cells called photoreceptors. These cells detect and transfer light energy to the light-sensitive tissue at the back of the eye (the retina). The function of the harmonin-protein complex in the retina is not well understood, but it is thought to be important in the development and function of photoreceptor cells.

Other names 
 AIE-75
 DFNB18
 HARMONIN
 NY-CO-37
 NY-CO-38
 PDZ-45
 PDZ-73
 PDZ73
 USH1C_HUMAN
 Usher syndrome 1C protein

References 

This article incorporates public domain text from The U.S. National Library of Medicine
U.S. National Library of Medicine: gene ush1c

Human genes